The Place Saint-Lambert is a major square in the centre of Liège, Belgium. Until 1794, it was the site of St. Lambert's Cathedral. Remains of the foundations of the cathedral have been conserved, and are on display at the Archéoforum, under the square.

The largest public building on the square is the former Prince-Bishops' Palace, which now houses the Palace of Justice of Liège and the Provincial Palace, i.e. the government building of Liège Province. There is a large bus station in the lower part of the square, which serves as the local transport hub for the city.

On 13 December 2011, a murder–suicide attack took place in the square, in which 6 people were killed and 125 were injured.

See also

 Belgium in "the long nineteenth century"

References

Notes

Squares in Liège